Dalal bint Mukhled Al-Harbi (Arabic: دلال بنت مخلد الحربي) is a Saudi historian interested in the history of women and their leadership role in the Arabian Peninsula and a member of the Saudi Shura Council, starting January 15, 2013. She has won many awards, including the King Abdulaziz Book Award in 2019.

Biography 
Al-Harbi was born and brought up in the city of Taif and she received her initial education there until middle school, then moved to the city of Riyadh, and completed her university studies there.

After the end of the university stage, Al-Harbi was appointed as a teaching assistant at the College of Education for Girls - Literary Departments, Department of History, then she obtained a master's degree for her dissertation tagged: “The relationship of the Sultanate of Najd and its annexes with Britain (1344-1345 AH / 1915-1927 AD)”, then she obtained a doctorate from the college and department Themselves, on her letter tagged: "The relationship of the Sultanate of Lahj with Britain (1377-1378 AH / 1918-1959 AD)". After that, she joined the faculty of the college as an assistant professor, then moved to the College of Arts, and obtained the rank of Associate Professor, and then was promoted to the rank of the professorship.

Since the beginning of her university life, Al-Harbi has been concerned with scientific research. What prompted her to read in-depth and accurate in her field of specialization, and she chose a path for herself that no one had taken care of before, which is: the history of women in the Arabian Peninsula in general, and the Kingdom of Saudi Arabia in particular, and she went on this path, and her efforts culminated in the publication of a group of books The studies have been widely accepted at the local and foreign levels, and have received great interest from individuals, scientific bodies and research institutions. They have been written about in scientific periodicals and the automotive press, and for this activity, they won two local awards.

Then Al-Harbi added to her "journalistic writing" activity; Where she publishes an article in a weekly corner in which she deals with various social, educational, and scientific topics. She also enjoys - currently - membership in several committees and bodies in various scientific and press institutions.

Academic career 

 Al-Harbi holds a BA in Arts and Education, majoring in History, and a MA and Ph.D. in Modern and Contemporary History, as well as a Diploma in English Language.
 She is currently working as a professor in the Department of History, College of Arts, Princess Noura Bint Abdul Rahman University.

Books and studies on women 

 The book "Famous Women of Najd", and this book was translated into English under the title: Prominent Women from Central Arabia, 2008.
 The book "The Contribution of Women to the Endowment of Books in the Najd region."
 The book “Women in Najd: Their Status and Role” (1200-1351 AH / 1786-1932 AD).
 The book "Ghalia Buqmiya".
 Study: Ghalia Al-Buqmiya: Her Life and Role in Resisting Muhammad Ali Pasha's Campaign on Soil.
 Study: Women in the Kingdom of Saudi Arabia "Past and Present."
 Study: Meccan Women and the Characteristic of Place.
 Study: “The endowment of Princess Sarah bint Imam Abdullah bin Faisal bin Turki Al Saud.”
 Study: “Fatimah Al-Sabhan: Her Life and Role in the Emirate of the Rasheed Family.”
 Study: "Noura bint Abdul Rahman bin Faisal Al Saud."
 Study: Reforming the girls ’khattab" in the Hijaz through an official document  (1350 AH / 1932 CE).

Other books and studies 

 Book: The relationship of the Sultanate of Lahj with Britain.
 Book: King Abdulaziz and the Strategy for Dealing with Events (The Case of Jeddah).
 Book: First and Second Saudi State News in the International Arab Encyclopedia.
 Study: “The Journey of Prince Faisal bin Abdulaziz to the United States of America (1364 AH / 1945AD).”
 Study: The evolution of the name of the Saudi state from the Najdi Sultanate to the Kingdom of Saudi Arabia (1339-1351 AH / 1920-1932 AD).
 Study: Internal conditions in Jeddah during the siege period (1343-1344 AH / 1924-1925 AD) through Al-Hijaz Post newspaper.
 Study: “King Faisal’s visit to Africa in 1392 AH / 1972 CE to consolidate the idea of Islamic solidarity”
 Study: "History of the Ruling Dynasties in the Arabian Peninsula".
 Study: "King Abdulaziz and the Care of the Yemenis in Britain in the Second World War."
 Book: The Kingdom of Saudi Arabia and the Global Economic Crisis, Implications, and Solutions 1348-1352 AH / 1929-1933 CE.

Other activities

 Review of the Arabic edition of (King Faisal: His Personality, His Age, and His Faith) book, by Professor Alexei Vasiliev.
 Al-Harbi is a writer for Al-Jazeera newspaper, with a weekly column entitled “Al-Bawareh”, and she received many letters of thanks for her journalistic writings.
 A member of several scientific societies, including the British Historical Society, the American Historical Society, the Saudi Historical Society, and the Society for History and Archeology of the Gulf Cooperation Council countries.
 A member of several charitable societies, and a member of scientific and cultural councils; Including the Board of Trustees of the Princess Jawaher Bint Nayef Center for Research and Development of Women.
 Part-time advisor to the High Authority for the Development of Riyadh.
 Founding member of the Saudi Society for Heritage Preservation.
 Headed some cultural committees outside the university.
 Member of the advisory board for scientific journals, including Al-Diriyah magazine, "Al-Mesbar magazine", and Islam and Contemporary World magazine.

Awards and honors 
 Al-Harbi has won numerous awards and been honored in more than one forum; Among the most prominent:
 Received the Prince Salman bin Abdulaziz Prize for Studies of the History of the Arabian Peninsula (1429-1430 AH / 2008-2009 AD).
 The Ministry of Culture and Information Prize for the book "History Branch", 1432 AH / 2012 AD.
 In 2019, she won the Civil Secretary Award for Research in the History of the Arabian Peninsula at its seventh session for all her scientific work on the leadership and social role of women in the history and culture of the Arabian Peninsula.
 Al-Harbi won the King Abdulaziz Book Prize in its fourth session in 2019 from the King Abdul Aziz House in the Book on the History of King Abdulaziz and the Kingdom of Saudi Arabia, through her book (The Kingdom of Saudi Arabia and the Global Economic Crisis, Reflections, and Solutions 1348-1352 AH / 1929-1933 AD).
 Al-Harbi has been awarded several medals, shields, and medals from different and many sides.

References 

Living people
Arab history
Year of birth missing (living people)
Women historians
Saudi Arabian historians